HMS Sunfish was a "twenty-seven knotter" torpedo boat destroyer of the British Royal Navy. Built by the Tyneside shipbuilder Hawthorn Leslie, Sunfish was one of three destroyers built by Hawthorns that year. She was sold for scrap in 1920.

Design and construction
The Admiralty laid down broad requirements for the destroyers, including speed, the use of an arched turtleback forecastle and armament, with the detailed design left to the builders, resulting in each of the builders producing different designs.

Displacement was  light and  full load. Armament consisted of a single QF 12 pounder 12 cwt gun and three 6-pounder guns, with two 18 inch (450 mm) torpedo tubes. One of the torpedo tubes could be removed to accommodate a further two six-pounders. The ship's crew was 53 officers and men.

On 17 September 1895 Sunfish was laid down as Yard Number 325 at Hawthorn Leslie's Hebburn, Tyneside shipyard, and was launched on 28 May 1895. The ship reached a speed of  during sea trials, and was completed in February 1896.

Service
Sunfish was commissioned at Chatham on 18 February 1896, replacing the destroyer  as tender to the battleship  as part of the Channel Fleet, with Havocks crew transferring over to Sunfish. Sunfish took part in the 1896 British Naval Manoeuvres, attached to the Channel Fleet operation from Berehaven in southern Ireland. She was part of the Mediterranean Fleet, but boiler problems caused her to be laid up at Malta from August 1900 to May 1902 while the boilers were re-tubed and the bottom reservoirs repaired. In June 1902 she left for Gibraltar, and early the following month she arrived at Plymouth, and proceeded to Chatham to pay off. Lieutenant John M. D. E. Warren was appointed in command on 2 August 1902, when she joined the Medway instructional flotilla. A month later, her stem was damaged during docking at Dundee in a gale, but she rejoined the flotilla in mid-October after repairs. In 1905, Sunfish was one of a number of old destroyers which the Rear Admiral (Destroyers) condemned as being "..all worn out", with "every shilling spent on these old 27-knotters is a waste of money".

Sunfish formed part of the Sixth Destroyer Flotilla at Devonport in 1910, and remained a part of that flotilla in 1912. On 5 June 1911 Sunfish hit the bow of the destroyer  when clearing her moorings at Waterford Harbour, and then when trying to get clear of Havock, collided with the Torpedo boat Torpedo Boat 045. Sunfish was slightly damaged and returned to Devonport for repair. On 30 August 1912 the Admiralty directed all destroyers were to be grouped into classes designated by letters based on contract speed and appearance.

By February 1913, Sunfish was not part of an active flotilla, but was attached as a tender to the shore establishment  at Devonport, with a nucleus crew and was still attached to Vivid in July 1914, on the eve of the outbreak of the First World War.

By January 1915, Sunfish was allocated to the Devonport Local Defence Flotilla. On 23 July 1917, Sunfish, still part of the Devonport Local Defence Flotilla, was involved in operations to hunt a submarine that had been spotted in Lyme Bay. Despite the submarine being spotted on the surface by a Motor Launch, the hunt was unsuccessful, with the submarine escaping. Sunfish remained at Devonport until the end of the war.

Sunfish was sold for scrap on 7 June 1920.

Pennant numbers

References

Notes

Citations

Bibliography
 
 
 
 
 
 
 
 

 

Ships built on the River Tyne
1895 ships
A-class destroyers (1913)
Sunfish-class destroyers